William Kennedy Gibson (1 October 1876 – 9 December 1949) was an Irish footballer and political activist.

Football career
Although born in Glasgow, Gibson's family were from Belfast, and Gibson moved there at a young age. He was noted as a talented footballer who played for Cliftonville F.C. while still at school. He also spent time in the north-east of England and played with local teams on an amateur basis, including Sunderland, for whom he made one appearance in the Football League in the 1901–02 season when the club finished as English champions.

He played thirteen matches for the Ireland national team from 1894 to 1902, making his debut aged 17, scoring once (against England) and captaining the side on four occasions.  He won numerous honours with Cliftonville,  including the Irish Cup in 1897 and 1901, before becoming President of the club, then becoming active in its management.

Political career
Outside football, Gibson worked as a solicitor, and he provided legal advice to the Irish Football Association, becoming its vice-chairman in 1907.  In 1909, he was elected to the Belfast Corporation as an independent Unionist, with the support of the Belfast Citizens' Association.  He defeated future Lord Mayor of Belfast William George Turner, who had the unofficial backing of the Conservative Party.

Gibson stood again as an independent Unionist in Belfast Ballynafeigh at the 1929 Northern Ireland general election, but he was narrowly defeated by Thomas Moles, the official Unionist candidate.

References

1876 births
1949 deaths
Footballers from Glasgow
Politicians from Belfast
Irish association footballers (before 1923)
Pre-1950 IFA international footballers
Solicitors from Northern Ireland
Independent politicians in Northern Ireland
Scottish footballers
Scottish people of Irish descent
Cliftonville F.C. players
Bishop Auckland F.C. players
Sunderland A.F.C. players
English Football League players
Members of Belfast City Council
Association footballers not categorized by position
Association footballers from Belfast
NIFL Premiership players
Irish League representative players